Caraca may refer to:
 Caraça (born 1932), Portuguese footballer
 Roman-era city of moot location in Hispania Tarraconensis, variously identified with current-day places as Taracena or Carabaña, Spain.
 Çərəcə, Azerbaijan